Santa Maria di Cesello or St Mary of the Chisel is a 15th-century, Roman Catholic church,  in San Severino Marche, region of Marche, Italy.

History
The small church has a rustic and provincial Romanesque style, a wide sloping roof that protects a seventeenth-century fresco. Inside all walls are covered with votive frescoes dating from 15th to 17th centuries.

References

Romanesque architecture in San Severino Marche
15th-century Roman Catholic church buildings in Italy
Roman Catholic churches in San Severino Marche